All Japan Women's Pro Wrestling: Queen of Queens (全日本女子プロレス -クィーン オブ クィーンズ-) is a professional wrestling video game released in 1995 on the PC-FX console and developed by NEC Home Electronics. It was released exclusively in Japan as the PC-FX was never sold outside of the country. It utilizes full motion video and is the only wrestling title developed for the console. The game is based on the AJW Joshi pro wrestling promotion.

Gameplay 
Queen of Queens uses FMV to achieve its unique gameplay style, all moves are initiated by button combinations, after being input a short movie will play showing the success or failure of the move. Matches can be won via either pinfall or submission. A stamina meter is present in addition to a regenerating health bar. The stamina bar restricts the pace of gameplay and the player must replenish in order to hit further moves.

Disc A features two gameplay modes, "League Mode" a round-robin tournament and single "Vs Mode". Disc B features the same options as Disc A but with an additional "Scenario mode". In scenario mode your chosen wrestler is challenged to prove that she is the best pro wrestler by defeating the wrestlers of the invading KWP promotion.

Roster 
The game features two distinct rosters made up of All Japan Women's Pro Wrestling talent on disc A & B, and fictional combatants from `KWP` on disc B only.

Aja Kong
Akira Hokuto
Yumiko Hotta
Manami Toyota
Toshiyo Yamada
Kyoko Inoue
Takako Inoue
Etsuko Mita
Mima Shimoda
Sakie Hasegawa

Lioness Asuka appears as the non-playable hostess of Queen of Queens tutorial section.

See also

List of licensed wrestling video games

References

1995 video games
PC-FX games
Japan-exclusive video games
Full motion video based games
All Japan Women's Pro-Wrestling
Professional wrestling games
Video games developed in Japan